Events from the year 1937 in Austria

Incumbents
President: Wilhelm Miklas 
Chancellor: Kurt Schuschnigg

Governors
 Burgenland: Hans Sylvester 
 Carinthia: Arnold Sucher 
 Lower Austria: Josef Reither
 Salzburg: Franz Rehrl 
 Styria: Karl Maria Stepan 
 Tyrol: Josef Schumacher
 Upper Austria: Heinrich Gleißner
 Vienna: Richard Schmitz 
 Vorarlberg: Ernst Winsauer

Events

Births
25 January - Werner Schneyder, writer, director, and actor (died 2019)
16 July - Kurt Mrkwicka, diver

Deaths

References

 
Years of the 20th century in Austria